Pontibacter brevis is a Gram-negative bacterium from the genus of Pontibacter which has been isolated from rhizospheric soil from the plant Tamarix ramosissima.

References 

Cytophagia
Bacteria described in 2018